Seaview is an industrial suburb of the city of Lower Hutt, itself a suburban area of greater Wellington.
Situated on the eastern coast of the Hutt Valley, it curves between Te Awa Kairangi / the Hutt River and Petone (to the west), and the bays of  Eastbourne to the south. Traditionally a very industrial suburb, an annex of the larger neighbouring Petone, Seaview has undergone rejuvenation as the local car-industry has died out. Known for  boganesque motor-racing, sultry weather, its former  car-industry and current revitalisation, the suburb has made a name for itself in Wellington in recent years.

History and Culture 
Seaview's history is generally not as well known in Wellington, as it is a small suburb with a history of industry rather than innovation and creativity. The area was prosperous for a period of time during precolonisation; the local Māori iwi, Te Ati Awa, had a village here called Owhiti. It was based on the riches of the Waiwhetu river, which was navigable well into the Hutt Valley, as far north as Belmont. However, disaster struck when the 1855 Wairarapa earthquake occurred, shattering the river into the low-lying stream it is today, and making the area a desolate strip of sandy swampland. The local shipyards were destroyed, and Pākehā settlers focused their efforts on Petone instead. Thus, Seaview was left to rot. 

Considered a "no-man's land" for long afterwards, it was undeveloped until Caltex decided to move operations into the area in 1929, controversially building a plant on the site of the former Wharenui of Owhiti. The Great Depression spurned local workers on, and Seaview began to grow into a trading estate that belied its small size. Ford opened an automobile plant here in 1936 in a distinctive and recently refurbished building, and so began a long production of Zodiacs, Zephyrs, Consuls, Prefects, Anglias and the Thames trucks and Fordson tractors. This history of car manufacturing, mostly done by local women, cemented Seaview's dynamic car culture, one that once again belies the suburb's size. Dulux established a plant in 1939, followed by more companies making industrial goods such as bolts, rivets, paint and chemicals, both in Seaview and the adjacent suburb of Gracefield as space became scarce. With this, Seaview had developed a prosperity that would boom for nearly sixty years, albeit one prosthetic and pollutive.

Seaview's culture has been shaped by the job losses and subsequent existentialism that came from closing of the Ford plant in 1988, as well as classic values of having a good time and rowdy fun. The boganesque culture here is highlighted by the local Port Road Drags. Many the classic cars built here, as well as Chevrolets and Pontiacs, often return to the marina for the annual Drags, a somewhat infamous (but not nearly as so in comparison to the local demolition derby, which today has a focus on family in an attempt to soften its image) drag race that has taken place on the Port Road each November since 1966. It is the longest running street drags in Australasia. Much of the Port Road is closed off especially, and classic cars fill Wellington on their way to Seaview on the day. Boy racers travel down from all over the country for it, especially ones in the Hutt Valley. In 2020, it was called off early when a spectator was almost killed. The marina is a considerably more placid affair during the rest of the year, when it is filled with many fishermen's boats.

Demographics
Seaview is included in the Gracefield statistical area.

Gallery

References

Suburbs of Lower Hutt
Populated places around the Wellington Harbour